Larry Mann (born Lawrence Zuckerman; April 3, 1924 – September 14, 1952) was an American stock car driver born in Yonkers, New York.  Mann was the first driver to be killed in a NASCAR Grand National race; he died from a pulmonary hemorrhage caused by a crash at Langhorne Speedway.

NASCAR career
He participated in six races in the 1952 season.  Overall, after his appearance in the 9th race of the season, Mann began racing more commonly after the 19th race, appearing in every other event; his best finish (11th) came at Monroe County Fairgrounds in Rochester, New York.

Death
Mann was killed during the 27th race of the 1952 season, which took place in Langhorne, Pennsylvania.  On the 211th lap, he crashed through a fence at the track, thereby flipping his Hudson Hornet.  After being rushed to Nazareth Hospital in nearby Philadelphia, he died in the evening of a pulmonary hemorrhage and massive head wounds.  Mann had been defying a superstition among NASCAR drivers by painting his vehicle green.

Mann would become the first of three drivers to be killed at Langhorne within five years; Frank Arford and John McVitty also perished while racing at the track in 1953 and 1956, respectively.

References

External links

1930 births
1952 deaths
People from Yonkers, New York
Racing drivers from New York City
NASCAR drivers
Racing drivers who died while racing
Sports deaths in Pennsylvania